The 2022 Marshall Thundering Herd football team represented Marshall University during the 2022 NCAA Division I FBS football season. The Thundering Herd played their home games at the Joan C. Edwards Stadium in Huntington, West Virginia, and competed in the East Division of the Sun Belt Conference. The team was coached by second-year head coach Charles Huff.

This was their inaugural season in the Sun Belt Conference after spending the previous 17 seasons as a member of Conference USA.

Previous season

The Thundering Herd finished the 2021 season 7–6, 5–3 in C-USA play to finish in second place in the East Division. The Thundering Herd ended their season losing the New Orleans Bowl to Louisiana. 

On October 30, 2021, Marshall announced they would become a member of the Sun Belt. On March 29, it was announced they would officially join on July 1, 2022, making it the final season competing in C-USA.

Preseason

Media poll
The Sun Belt media days were held on July 25 and July 26. The Thundering Herd were predicted to finish in fourth place in the Sun Belt's East Division.

Sun Belt Preseason All-Conference teams

Offense

1st team
Rasheen Ali – Running back, RS-SO

Defense

2nd team
Abraham Beauplan – Linebacker, RS-SR

Schedule
All conference games were announced March 1, 2022.

Schedule Source:

Game summaries

Norfolk State

at No. 8 Notre Dame

at Bowling Green

at Troy

Gardner–Webb

Louisiana

at James Madison

Coastal Carolina

at Old Dominion

Appalachian State

at Georgia Southern

Georgia State

vs UConn

Staff

References

Marshall
Marshall Thundering Herd football seasons
Myrtle Beach Bowl champion seasons
Marshall Thundering Herd football